ARC 7 de Agosto (PZE-47) is a Colombian-built large offshore patrol vessel of the Colombian Navy. The ship, laid down in August 2013, was built by the firm Cotecmar in Cartagena, Colombia, and used the German design of the Fassmer , modified to fulfill the requirements of the Colombian Navy. The construction, modified design and engineering was made by Colombians.

References

Patrol vessels of the Colombian Navy
Ships built in Colombia
2013 ships